Bill Johnson (born June 23, 1955) is an American football coach and former defensive lineman who is the defensive line coach for the Houston Roughnecks of the XFL.

Collegiate coaching career
Johnson began his coaching career at Northwestern State in Louisiana as a graduate assistant before becoming a defensive ends/linebackers coach at the school. He then served as defensive line coach and also outside linebackers coach at McNeese State. 

Johnson spent one season at Miami before returning to Louisiana as the defensive line coach at Louisiana Tech. He then spent two seasons as defensive line coach at Arkansas before moving to Texas A&M as their defensive line coach. He then returned to Arkansas as their defensive line coach for one season before moving to the NFL. He served as defensive line coach at LSU from 2019 to 2020. Johnson's intentions to retire following the 2020 season were made public on December 21, 2020,  but he stayed on staff at LSU for the 2021 season as a defensive analyst.

Professional coaching career
Johnson has served as a defensive line coach for the Atlanta Falcons, Denver Broncos, New Orleans Saints, Los Angeles Rams, and Birmingham Stallions of the USFL.

In 2022, Johnson joined the XFL as the defensive line coach for the Houston Roughnecks.

References

1955 births
Living people
Sportspeople from Monroe, Louisiana
Coaches of American football from Louisiana
Players of American football from Louisiana
American football centers
Northwestern State Demons football players
Northwestern State Demons football coaches
McNeese Cowboys football coaches
Miami Hurricanes football coaches
Louisiana Tech Bulldogs football coaches
Arkansas Razorbacks football coaches
Texas A&M Aggies football coaches
LSU Tigers football coaches
Atlanta Falcons coaches
Denver Broncos coaches
New Orleans Saints coaches
Los Angeles Rams coaches
Birmingham Stallions (2022) coaches
Houston Roughnecks coaches